Gaia (died 207 BCE) was an ancient Berber king of the Massylii, an eastern Numidian tribe in North Africa.

Gaia reigned during the Second Punic War of ancient Rome. He was the father of King Masinissa, and the brother of Oezalces.

Greco-Roman authors give his name as "Gala", but an inscription in Dougga indicates it may have instead been "Gaia".

See also
List of Kings of Numidia

Notes

207 BC deaths
3rd-century BC Berber people
Kings of Numidia
Year of birth unknown